Elin Kling (born 17 February 1983, in Mariestad) is a Swedish fashion blogger, fashion journalist and co-founder of women's clothing label Totême.

Career 
Kling launched her personal fashion blog in 2007 on Swedish media site Stureplan and became the country's most-followed fashion blog within two days.

She began her career in fashion at Swedish lifestyle magazine Solo, and worked as head of the fashion desk at Sweden's second largest newspaper, Expressen. Her personal fashion blog was also hosted on the website of TV4, Sweden's largest television network. In 2009, she became head stylist for Swedish Idol.

In 2009, Kling co-founded digital media company Fashion Networks with Christian Remröd. The two also worked together to launch the brand Nowhere.

Kling participated in Let's Dance 2010.

Kling launched her first clothing line, Elin Kling for H&M, in 2011. Kling was the first blogger to design a collection for H&M. The same year, she launched her own magazine, Styleby. She served as the magazine's fashion editor and creative director. In 2012, Kling created a collection for Guess by Marciano.

In 2014, she launched the clothing line Totême with her husband, Karl Lindman.

Personal life 
Kling grew up on a farm in Mariestad, Sweden. She later moved to Stockholm where she began her career as a fashion journalist and blogger.

Kling married Karl Lindman in 2014. The two founded clothing line Totême together the same year in New York. The couple reside in Stockholm and have one daughter.

See also
Let's Dance 2010

References

External links
Official Website

1983 births
Living people
People from Mariestad Municipality
Swedish bloggers
Swedish women bloggers
Swedish journalists
Swedish women journalists